Ferrante II  may refer to:
 Ferdinand II of Naples (1469–1496)
 Ferrante II of Guastalla, of the House of Gonzaga (1575–1630)
 Ferdinand II of the Two Sicilies (1810–1859)